MBC C&I (formerly MBC Mediatech and MBC Production)  is a Korean drama production company. MBC C&I is a subsidiary of Munhwa Broadcasting Corporation.

List of works

TV series

TV shows

Films

References

External links
  

Munhwa Broadcasting Corporation subsidiaries
Television production companies of South Korea
Companies based in Seoul
South Korean companies established in 1990
Mass media companies established in 1990